The Observer has been serving Sarnia-Lambton since 1853 and publishes five times per week, Tuesday through Saturday.

The offices of the Observer are in Sarnia. The paper is printed in London, Ontario, on presses owned by Postmedia, which also publishes the London Free Press and Windsor Star.

See also
List of newspapers in Canada

References

External links
 Sarnia Observer

Mass media in Sarnia
Postmedia Network publications
Daily newspapers published in Ontario
Publications established in 1853
1853 establishments in Canada